Everhardus Jacobus Ariëns (29 January 1918 –  3 March 2002) was a Dutch pharmacologist and professor at the Catholic University of Nijmegen (now Radboud University Nijmegen). He made important contributions to the function of receptors and the mathematical description of ligand–receptor interactions (receptor theory). Moreover, Everhardus Ariëns was the initiator for the collection of stereochemistry in drug development and spearheading the development of enantiopure drugs.

Early life 

Everhardus Ariëns grew up as the sixth of ten children in Wijk bij Duurstede. After a temporary boarding school experience, in 1935 he was admitted to Wageningen, the general university. Then he took a degree in chemistry at the University of Utrecht in which he completed in 1942, although his preference was actually the biology. Another study was interrupted by the Second World War. After his refusal to sign a declaration of loyalty to the German Reich and an escape from the Germany occupied Netherlands via Switzerland, France and England, he found asylum with the U.S. Army. He completed the unfinished part of his studies medicine after the Second World War.

Scientific activity 

After World War II he worked in the laboratory of Prof. UG Bijlsma in the area of adrenergic substances and in 1950 both in the field of chemistry and medical doctorate. In 1951, Everhardus Ariëns moved to Nijmegen after there at the Catholic University of the Faculty of Pharmacology was established. From 1954 until his retirement he was employed there as a professor.

Based on his dissertation, he developed together with Jacques van Rossum, a method for quantification of pharmacological effects as a result of ligand-receptor interactions. The thesis developed the concepts of receptor affinity and intrinsic activity. With the help of these terms he could describe the behavior of agonists and antagonists as well as the dual agonist / antagonist behavior of partial agonists. An important accomplishment of Ariëns was the establishment of experiments on isolated organs instead of the living animal (ex vivo), which quickly and reproducibly delivered data on the affinity and intrinsic activity of test substances.

Everhardus Ariëns was also active in the field of structure-activity relationships (SAR), a branch of medicinal chemistry. With the provocative statement that the then commonly used racemates were drugs with 50% contamination. he triggered a debate among pharmacologists and medicinal chemists and alerted the drug regulators. Everhardus Ariëns was thus the crucial precursor for the targeted development of enantiopure drugs. Another, though less noticed controversy he started by expressing his view that drug metabolism is wasted and called for the development of metabolism-resistant drugs. In addition, he followed in the tradition of Dutch pharmacists to combat quackery.

Honors and awards 

Everhardus Ariëns 1963 was honored at the second International Congress of Pharmacology in Prague with the Purkinje Medal. In 1970 he became member of the Royal Netherlands Academy of Arts and Sciences. He also received the Dr. Saal van Zwanenberg Award (1972), the Medal of the Norwegian Poulsson Pharmacological Society (1973), the Scheele Award (1974), the Schmiedeberg Medal (1980) and the Smissman Award of the American Chemical Society (1985).
Everhardus Ariëns was awarded honorary doctorates from universities Universidade Luterana do Brasil, University of Kiel, University of Paris-Sud and Università degli Studi di Camerino. Another honorary doctorate was awarded in March 2002 at the Ohio State University.

References

Further reading

External links 
 

1918 births
2002 deaths
Dutch pharmacologists
Members of the Royal Netherlands Academy of Arts and Sciences
People from Wijk bij Duurstede
Utrecht University alumni
Academic staff of Radboud University Nijmegen
Stereochemists